B. intermedia may refer to:

 Beaufortia intermedia, a ray-finned fish species
 Belgrandiella intermedia,a recently extinct species of very small freshwater snail that was endemic to Central Europe, particularly to Austria
 Boerhavia intermedia, the five-wing spiderling, a plant species found in the southwestern United States and northern Mexico
 Brachytarsophrys intermedia, an amphibian species found in Vietnam and possibly in Cambodia and Laos
 Bythinella intermedia, a recently extinct species of very small freshwater snail that was endemic to Austria

Synonyms
 Bacularia intermedia, a synonym for Linospadix minor, the minor walking stick palm, a small tropical forest palm species found in North-East Queensland

See also
 Intermedia (disambiguation)